Bailey's Bay is a long shallow indentation in the northeastern shore of the main island of Bermuda. It stretches for about  along the north coast of Hamilton Parish. The settlement which stretches along the bay's coast is also called Bailey's Bay.

The entrance to the bay is protected by a long reef which rises to the surface at several points, most notably as Bay Island.

A footbridge crosses the northeastern extremity of the bay. This bridge is part of the Bermuda Railway Trail, a walking path which follows the track of the former Bermuda Railway.

References

Bays of Bermuda
Populated places in Bermuda